Clelea pravata is a species of moth in the family Zygaenidae. It is found on Java in Indonesia.

References

Moths described in 1858
Procridinae